Rownhams services is a motorway service station on the M27 motorway, close to the junction for the M271 motorway which leads into Southampton. It is owned by Roadchef. In 2012, the westbound side was refurbished, and a McDonald's restaurant was added. Eastbound traffic can access this by walking through a subway under the motorway.

External links 
Motorway Services Online - Rownhams

RoadChef motorway service stations
Transport in Hampshire
Test Valley